is a railway station in Shiroishi, Kishima District, Saga Prefecture, Japan. It is operated by JR Kyushu and is on the Nagasaki Main Line.

Lines

Station layout 
The station consists of two side platforms serving two tracks with a siding running along the other side of platform 2. The station building, a modern structure of steel frame and glass, is unstaffed and serves only as a waiting room. Access to the opposite side platform is by means of a footbridge.

Adjacent stations

History
Japanese Government Railways (JGR) built the station in the 1930s during the development of an alternative route for the Nagasaki Main Line along the coast of the Ariake Sea which was at first known as the Ariake Line. Hizen-Shiroishi, then named  was opened on the same day as an intermediate station on the new track. On 1 December 1934, the entire route was completed and through-traffic achieved from Hizen-Yamaguchi through the station to Nagasaki. The line was then redesignated as part of the Nagasaki Main Line. On 1 April 1940, the station was renamed Hizen-Shiroishi. With the privatization of Japanese National Railways (JNR), the successor of JGR, on 1 April 1987, control of the station passed to JR Kyushu.

On 15 October 2016, a new station building was opened. The old building had to make way for the widening of a prefectural road and has been demolished.

Passenger statistics
In fiscal 2016, the station was used by an average of 721 passengers daily (boarding passengers only), and it ranked 202nd among the busiest stations of JR Kyushu.

Longest one-way rail ticket in Japan
From April 1, 1988, to April 30, 1989, this station, along with the Sasebo Line's Ōmachi Station, was the starting point from which one could purchase the longest one-way ticket in Japan.

Surroundings
 Shiroishi High School (佐賀県立白石高等学校)
 Shiroishi Agricultural High School (佐賀県立佐賀農業高等学校)
 National Route 207
 Saga Prefecture Route 36

See also
 List of railway stations in Japan

References

External links
 Hizen-Shiroishi Station (JR Kyushu)

Railway stations in Saga Prefecture
Nagasaki Main Line
Railway stations in Japan opened in 1930